The Qom University of Medical Sciences,  (Danushgah-e 'lum Pezeshki-ye Qâm) in Qom, Iran.

History 
The agreement on establishing a School of Nursing and School of Public Health was announced by the Ministry of Health and Medical Education. In 1997 the school began work by admitting students for a B.Sc in nursing. In 1998, the Development Center for Medical Universities agreed to admit students in Environmental Health to the school and the first group began their course in February 1999.

In the next step, ratified by the Ministry of Health and Medical Education in 2000, six subordinate hospitals of the school including Hazrat Zahra, Kamkar Arab Nia, Nekooei Hedayati, Fatemi Sahamieh Children's Hospital, Izadi and Hazrat Masoomeh became teaching hospitals. Then admitting students in Operating Room and Professional Health courses was agreed by the development center for medical universities in 2002.

The establishment of the School of Medicine was the result of a ratification by the Development Center for Medical Universities agreeing upon admitting a series of medical students in 2003 and following that a final agreement on establishing the school of medicine in August 2004.
The first group of medical students was admitted and began their courses in October 2004. Finally and regarding a request by the dean of Qom School of Medicine and Health Services, the development center for medical universities made an agreement to promoting the school to the Qom University of Medical Sciences and Health Services in January 2005.

The last permission granted to the university by the Development Center for Medical Universities was about admitting students for BSc/Pass Degree in Environmental Health whose first group had been admitted.

Qom University of Medical Sciences consists of three schools, five majors, 51 faculty members and PhD students on scholarship, approximately 720 students and some invited professors.

The university is responsible for educating students in majors of medicine, conducting medical academic and clinical researches as well as holding scientific and academic seminars and conferences and offering health care services. It also provides the students with apprenticeship and internship courses in medicine, nursing, midwifery and lab sciences at Islamic Azad University, Qom branch.

The organization structure 
The organizational structure of the university, ratified by The Iranian Management and Planning Organization, is: 
 Dean of the university, along with 
 Six Vice-deans: 
 Vice-dean for Education and Research, 
 Vice-dean for Culture & Student Affairs, 
 Vice-dean for Health Care, 
 Vice-dean for Medicine and Food, 
 Vice-dean for Public Health, 
 Vice-dean for Resource and Management Development.

The heads of faculties are chosen by the Dean, and operate the faculties in association with the office of Vice-dean for Education. The heads of teaching hospitals are also chosen and assigned from faculty members and by the Dean.

Hospitals 
Kamkar
Nekuei
Hazrat zahra
Hazrat masoome
Shahid beheshti
Izadi

Schools 
School of medicine
School of dentistry
School of public health
School of Nursing & Midwifery
School of Paramedical

See also 
University of Medical Science

References

Medical schools in Iran
Buildings and structures in Qom
Education in Qom Province